Muhammad Adil Shah or Mohammed Adil Shah may refer to:

Muhammad Adil Shah (died 1557), Sultan of Delhi, of the Sur dynasty
Mohammed Adil Shah, Sultan of Bijapur, died 1656 and buried in the Gol Gumbaz